Parliamentary elections were held for the second time in Persia in 1909. The new Parliament convened on 19 November. The majority of the parliament was held by a some 53-seats coalition pioneered by Moderate Socialists Party.

References

1909 in Iran
1909 elections in Asia
National Consultative Assembly elections
2nd term of the Iranian Majlis
Politics of Qajar Iran